U.S. cities and communities with large Polish American populations are largely concentrated in the Upper Midwestern United States, Chicago metropolitan area and the New York metropolitan area, with Wisconsin accounting for the largest number of communities with large Polish populations.

Ranked by population
The following cities and municipalities are among those that have 10,000 or more residents who are of Polish ancestry (in descending order by Polish population):
 New York City, New York - 213,447 (2.7%).
 Chicago, Illinois - 210,421 (7.3%).
 Philadelphia, Pennsylvania - 65,508 (4.3%).
 Milwaukee, Wisconsin - 57,485 (9.6%).
 Los Angeles, California - 56,670 (1.5%).
 Cheektowaga, New York - 37,560 (39.9%).
 Buffalo, New York - 34,254 (11.7%).
 Phoenix, Arizona - 32,050 (2.4%).
 Toledo, Ohio - 31,792 (10.1%).
Warren, Michigan - 28,370 (21%)
 Pittsburgh, Pennsylvania - 28,178 (8.4%).
 San Diego, California - 25,201 (2.1%).
 Cleveland, Ohio - 22,978 (4.8%).
Sterling Heights, Michigan - 21,530 (17.35%)
 Houston, Texas - 19,290 (1%).
 Detroit, Michigan - 18,992 (2.0%).
 Omaha, Nebraska - 18,447.
 Baltimore, Maryland - 18,400 (2.8%).
 Parma, Ohio - 15,503 (18.1%).
 Grand Rapids, Michigan - 15,442 (7.8%).
 Amherst, New York - 15,136 (13%).
 Erie, Pennsylvania - 14,718 (14.2%).
 San Antonio, Texas - 14,475 (1.3%).
 San Francisco, California - 14,332 (1.8%).
 New Britain, Connecticut - 14,257 (19.9%).
 West Seneca, New York - 14,236 (31%).
 Boston, Massachusetts - 13,704 (2.3%).
 Seattle, Washington - 12,622 (2.2%).
 Las Vegas, Nevada - 12,188 (2.5%).
 South Bend, Indiana - 11,417 (10.7%).
 Scranton, Pennsylvania - 11,311 (14.8%).
 Jacksonville, Florida - 10,500 (1.4%).

Ranked by percentage
The following communities have more than 30% of the population as being of Polish ancestry, based on data extracted from the United States Census, 2000, for communities with more than 1,000 individuals identifying their ancestry (in descending order by percentage of population):
Pulawski Township, Michigan 65.7%
Posen Township, Michigan 65.4%
Posen, Michigan 56.1%
Sharon, Wisconsin 53.7%
Bevent, Wisconsin 52.7%
Sloan, New York 46.8%
Dupont, Pennsylvania 46.6%
Wallington, New Jersey 45.5%
Alban, Wisconsin 44.7%
Independence, Wisconsin 43.7%
Linwood, Wisconsin 43.1%
Stockton, Wisconsin 42.9%
Swan River, Minnesota (Sobieski, Minnesota) 41.5%
Nanticoke, Pennsylvania 41.2%
Alberta, Minnesota 39.8%
Newport, Pennsylvania 37.1%
Reid, Wisconsin 37.0%
Arcadia, Wisconsin 36.7%
Lincoln, Michigan 36.2%
Glen Lyon, Pennsylvania 35.1%
Minto, North Dakota 34.8%
Hull, Wisconsin 34.4%
Bingham, Michigan 34.1%
Maple Grove, Wisconsin 33.8%
Carson, Wisconsin 33.7%
Ubly, Michigan 33.6%
Duryea, Pennsylvania 32.8%
Dickson City, Pennsylvania 32.6%
Shenandoah, Pennsylvania 32.6%
Harwood Heights, Illinois 32.5%
Dwight, Michigan 32.1%
Kulpmont, Pennsylvania 32.1%
Loup City, Nebraska 31.8%
Pulaski, Wisconsin 31.7%
Cheektowaga, New York 31.6%
Depew, New York 31.2%
Holding, Minnesota 30.9%
Filer, Michigan 30.8%
Angelica, Wisconsin 30.7%
Whiting, Wisconsin 30.7%
Pike Creek, Minnesota 30.6%
Buena Vista, Wisconsin 30.3%
Burbank, Illinois 30.3%
New York Mills, New York 30.3%
Rietbrock, Wisconsin 30.2%

See also
 Lists of U.S. cities with large ethnic population
 Poles in Omaha

References

Polish American
Polish-American history
Poland-related lists